Kadıoğlu Tunnel, is a highway tunnel constructed in Ordu Province, northern Turkey.

Kadıoğlu Tunnel is part of the Samsun-Ordu Highway   within the Black Sea Coastal Highway, of which construction was carried out by the Turkish Nurol-Tekfen-Yüksel joint venture. The -long twin-tube tunnel carrying two lanes of traffic in each direction. The Kozbükü Tunnel follows the Kadıoğlu Tunnel in direction Ordu.

The tunnel was opened to traffic on 7 April 2007 by Turkish Prime Minister Recep Tayyip Erdoğan. Dangerous goods carriers are not permitted to use the tunnel.

References

External links
 Map of road tunnels in Turkey at General Directorate of Highways (Turkey) (KGM)

Road tunnels in Turkey
Transport in Ordu Province
Tunnels completed in 2007